Portugal competed at the 1988 Summer Olympics in Seoul, South Korea.

A dodadinal delegation of sixty four competitors participated in a new record number of fourteen sports. Portugal's only medal was its second Olympic gold ever, won by the Los Angeles 1984 women's marathon bronze medalist Rosa Mota who added the Olympic title to her European and World marathon titles. The future Olympic champion Fernanda Ribeiro debuted in the Olympics but didn't finish her participation.

The athletics hosted most of the Portuguese competitors' events, confirming this nation's great athletic potential at the Olympic level. Swimming events also registered a bigger amount than the usual. In its second Olympic archery competition, Portugal sent two men as well as its first female Olympic archer who established a new high ranking for a Portuguese archer at 37th.

Medalist

Competitors
The following is the list of number of competitors in the Games.

Results by event

Archery
Men's Individual Competition:
 Carlos Reis
Open round — 1176 pts (→ 66th, did not advance)
{|class=wikitable style="text-align:center;"
!Distance!!90m!!70m!!50m!!30m!!Total
|-
!Round 1
|256||284||292||334||1176
|}

 Rui Santos 
Open round — 1160 pts (→ 70th, did not advance)
{|class=wikitable style="text-align:center;"
!Distance!!90m!!70m!!50m!!30m!!Total
|-
!Round 1
|258||281||299||322||1160
|}

Women's Individual Competition:
 Ana Sousa
Open round — 1213 pts (→ 37th, did not advance)
{|class=wikitable style="text-align:center;"
!Distance!!90m!!70m!!50m!!30m!!Total
|-
!Round 1
|283||303||295||332||1213
|}

Athletics

Men's events
100m:
 Luís Cunha
 Round 1 (heat 11) — 10.80 (→ 5th, did not advance)
 Pedro Agostinho
 Round 1 (heat 6) — did not finish

200m:
 Luís Barroso
 Round 1 (heat 9) — 21.31 (→ 2nd)
 Round 2 (heat 3) — 20.81 (→ 4th, did not advance)
 Luís Cunha
 Round 1 (heat 7) — 21.72 (→ 4th, did not advance)

400m:
 Filipe Lomba 
 Round 1 (heat 2) — 47.57 (→ 5th, did not advance)

800m:
 Álvaro Silva
 Round 1 (heat 4) — 1:49.09 (→ 3rd)
 Round 2 (heat 4) — 1:46.65 (→ 3rd)
 Semi-final (heat 2) — 1:45.12 (→ 5th, did not advance)
 António Abrantes
 Round 1 (heat 3) — 1:49.01 (→ 4th, did not advance)

1,500m:
 Mário Silva
 Round 1 (heat 2) — 3:42.24 (→ 5th)
 Final — 3:38.77 (→ 9th)

5,000m:
 Domingos Castro
 Round 1 (heat 1) — 13:47.91 (→ 4th)
 Semi-final — 13:22.44 (→ 1st)
 Final — 13:16.09 (→ 4th)
 Fernando Couto
 Round 1 (heat 2) — 13:58.72 (→ 8th, did not advance)
 José Regalo
 Round 1 (heat 3) — 13:43.59 (→ 9th)
 Semi-final — 13:24.48 (→ 3rd)
 Final — did not finish

10,000m: 
 António Pinto 
 Round 1 (heat 1) — 28:15.63 (→ 6th)
 Final — 28:09.53 (→ 13th) 
 Dionísio Castro
 Round 1 (heat 1) — did not finish
 Ezequiel Canario 
 Round 1 (heat 2) — 28:43.02 (→ 9th, did not advance)

Marathon 
 Joaquim Silva — 2:18:05 (→ 27th)
 Paulo Catarino — DNF

20 km Walk:
 Hélder Oliveira — 1:27:39 (→ 39th)
 José Pinto — 1:26:33 (→ 31st)
 José Urbano — 1:24:56 (→ 29th)

50 km Walk:
 José Pinto — 3:55:57 (→ 21st)

110m Hurdles:
 João Lima
 Round 1 (heat 5) — 14.73 (→ 6th, did not advance)

4 × 100 m Relay: 
 Arnaldo Abrantes, Luís Barroso, Pedro Agostinho and Pedro Curvelo 
 Round 1 (heat 4) — 39.61 (→ 3rd)
 Semi-final (heat 2) — disqualified

4 × 400 m Relay: 
 Álvaro Silva, António Abrantes, Filipe Lomba and Paulo Curvelo 
 Round 1 (heat 2) — 3:07.75 (→ 3rd)
 Semi-final (heat 1) — 3:07.75 (→ 7th, did not advance)

Long Jump: 
 José Leitão 
Qualifying Round (group 1) — 6,99 (→ 15th, did not advance)
{| class="wikitable" style="text-align:center;"
!Attempt!!width=20%|1!!width=20%|2!!width=20%|3
|-
!Result
|X||6,99||6,81
|}

Triple Jump: 
 José Leitão 
Qualifying Round (group 1) — 15,60 (→ 16th, did not advance)
{| class="wikitable" style="text-align:center;"
!Attempt!!width=20%|1!!width=20%|2!!width=20%|3
|-
!Result
|15,51||15,60||15,47
|}

Women's events
3000m:
 Fernanda Ribeiro
 Round 1 (heat 1) — 9:05.92 (→ 13th, did not advance)

10000m:
 Albertina Dias
 Round 1 (heat 2) — 32:13.85 (→ 5th)
 Final — 32:07.13 (→ 10th)
 Albertina Machado
 Round 1 (heat 1) — 31:52.04 (→ 7th)
 Final — 32:02.13 (→ 9th)

Marathon: 
 Aurora Cunha — did not start
 Conceição Ferreira — 2:34:23 (→ 20th)
 Rosa Mota — 2:25:40 (→  Gold Medal)

Canoeing

Sprint
Men

Equestrian
Men's Individual Jumping:
 Manuel Malta da Costa — 33rd
{| class="wikitable" style="text-align:center;"
!rowspan=2|Qualifying!!rowspan=2|Time!!colspan=3|Penalties!!rowspan=2|Pts!!rowspan=2|Rank
|-
!Obstacle!!Time!!Total
|-
!Round 1
|107.44||0||0.00||0.00||69.50||1st
|-
!Round 2
|98.05||20||1.00||21.00||25.00||?
|-
!colspan=2|Total
|20||1.00||21.00||94.50||26th
|}

{| class="wikitable" style="text-align:center;"
!rowspan=2|Final!!rowspan=2|Time!!colspan=3|Penalties!!rowspan=2|Rank
|-
!Obstacle!!Time!!Total
|-
!Round 1
|106.24||24||0.00||24.00||33rd
|}

Fencing
Men's épée
 José Bandeira — 67th
 Round 1 (pool 15) — 5 matches, 1 victory (→ 5th, did not advance)
 Cezary Siess (POL) (→ lost by 5:3)
 Rafael Di Tella (ARG) (→ lost by 5:5)
 Arwin Kardolus (NED) (→ lost by 5:3)
 Arnd Schmitt (FRG) (→ lost by 5:1)
 Alfredo Bogarin Arzamendia (PAR) (→ won by 5:3)

 Óscar Pinto — 74th
 Round 1 (pool 2) — 4 matches, 0 victories (→ 5th, did not advance)
 Andre Kuhn (SUI) (→ lost by 5:3)
 Roberto Lazzarini (BRA) (→ lost by 5:2)
 Stéphane Ganeff (NED) (→ lost by 5:1)
 Sandro Cuomo (ITA) (→ lost by 5:0)

 Roberto Durão — 60th
 Round 1 (pool 3) — 4 matches, 1 victory (→ 4th)
 Jean Michel Henry (FRA) (→ lost by 5:1)
 Robert Marx (USA) (→ won by 5:5)
 Il-Hee Lee (KOR) (→ lost by 5:3)
 Fernando Pena (ESP) (→ lost by 5:2)
 Round 2 (pool 12) — 4 matches, 0 victories (→ 5th, did not advance)
 Stephen Trevor (USA) (→ lost by 5:2)
 Mauricio Rivas (COL) (→ lost by 5:2)
 Johannes Nagele (AUT) (→ lost by 5:2)
 Stefan Joos (BEL) (→ lost by 5:1)

Men's foil
 José Bandeira — 55th
 Round 1 (pool 12) — 5 matches, 1 victory (→ 5th, did not advance)
 Andrea Borella (ITA) (→ lost by 5:2)
 Shaopei Lao (CHN) (→ lost by 5:2)
 Chung Man Lee (HKG) (→ won by 5:2)
 Thierry Soumagne (BEL) (→ lost by 5:1)
 Stephen Angers (CAN) (→ lost by 5:1)

Gymnastics

Artistics
Men's Individual All-Round Competition:
 Hélder Pinheiro — 109.600 pts (→ 85th)
{|class=wikitable style="text-align:center;"
|colspan=9|Subdivision 1 (Group 4)
|-
!Round!!Floor!!Pomm. Horse!!Rings!!Vault!!Parallel Bars!!Horizontal Bar!!colspan=2|Total
|- 
!Ia
|9.300||9.450||8.700||8.800||9.200||9.200||54.650||rowspan=2|109.600
|-
!Ib
|9.200||9.600||9.250||9.150||9.400||8.350||54.950
|}

Women's Individual All-Round Competition:
 Sónia Moura — 83rd
{|class=wikitable style="text-align:center;"
|colspan=7|Subdivision 1 (Group 3)
|-
!Round!!Vault!!Uneven Bars!!Balance Beam!!Floor!!colspan=2|Total
|- 
!Ia
|9.300||9.375||8.775||9.175||36.625||rowspan=2|73.025
|-
!Ib
|9.575||9.275||8.400||9.150||36.400
|}

Rhythmics
Women's Individual All-Round Competition:
 Patricia Jorge — 37.050 pts (→ 30th)
{|class=wikitable style="text-align:center;"
|colspan=5|Preliminary Round
|-
!Rope!!Hoop!!Clubs!!Ribbon!!Total
|- 
|9.350||9.100||9.200||9.400||37.050
|}

Judo
Men's Extra Lightweight (–60 kg):
 Renato Santos
Pool B
 1/32 finals — Bye
 1/16 finals — Carlos Sotillo (ESP) (→ won by kiken-gachi)
 1/8 finals — Zhang Guojun (CHN) (→ lost by yusei-gachi, did not advance)

 Hugo Assunção
Pool A
 1/32 finals — James Sibenge (ZIM) (→ won by ippon)
 1/16 finals — Eugene McManus (IRL) (→ won by yusei-gachi)
 1/8 finals — Anders Dahlin (SWE) (→ lost by koka, did not advance)

Men's Half Middleweight (–78 kg):
 Pedro Cristóvão
Pool A
 1/32 finals — Bye
 1/16 finals — Neil Adams (GBR) (→ lost by ippon, did not advance)

Women's Half Middleweight (–61 kg):
 Teresa Gaspar
Pool B
 1/4 finals — Lynn Roethke (USA) (→ lost by yuko)
 Repêchage — Boguslawa Olechnowicz (POL) (→ lost by ippon, did not advance)

Modern pentathlon
One male pentathlete represented Portugal in 1988.

Men's Individual Competition:
 Manuel Barroso — 4844 pts (→ 34th)
{|class=wikitable style="text-align:center;"
!Event
!Riding
!Fencing
!Swimming
!Shooting
!Cross-country
!Total
|-
!Pts
|910
|677
|1236
|802
|1219
|4844
|}

Men's Team Competition:
 Manuel Barroso — 4844 pts (→ 22nd)

Sailing
Star:
 Henrique Anjos and Patricio de Barros — 115 pts (→ 15th)
{|class=wikitable style="text-align:center;"
!Race!!1!!2!!3!!4!!5!!6!!7!!rowspan=2|Total!!rowspan=2|Net
|-
!Place
|16th||13th||8th||16th||14th||16th||12th
|-
!Pts
|22||19||14||22||20||22||18||137||115
|}

Division II:
 Luís Calico — 132 pts (→ 19th)
{|class=wikitable style="text-align:center;"
!Race!!1!!2!!3!!4!!5!!6!!7!!rowspan=2|Total!!rowspan=2|Net
|-
!Place
|23rd||26th||14th||15th||9th||23rd||12th
|-
!Pts
|29||32||20||21||15||29||18||164||132
|}

Shooting
Men's 10m Air Pistol:
 José Pena — did not start

Men's Trap:
 Hélder Cavaco — 139 hits (→ 37th)
{|class="wikitable" style="text-align:center;"
!Round!!1!!2!!3!!4!!5!!6!!7!!8!!Total
|-
!Hits
|25||21||24||23||24||22||–||–||139
|}

 João Rebelo — 190 hits (→ 18th)
{|class="wikitable" style="text-align:center;"
!Round!!1!!2!!3!!4!!5!!6!!7!!8!!Total
|-
!Hits
|24||24||25||24||22||24||24||23||190
|}

Swimming

Men's Events
100m Breaststroke:
 Alexandre Yokochi
 Heats (heat 2) — 1:05.66 (→ 1st, did not advance – 40th overall)

200m Breaststroke:
 Alexandre Yokochi
 Heats (heat 6) — 2:17.87 (→ 5th)
 Final B — 2:18.01 (→ 1st – 9th overall)

100m Butterfly:
 Mabílio Albuquerque
 Heats (heat 2) — 57.30 (→ 2nd, did not advance – 33rd overall)
 Paulo Camacho
 Heats (heat 3) — 57.62 (→ 4th, did not advance, 37th place)

200m Butterfly:
 Diogo Madeira
 Heats (heat 2) — 2:03.79 (→ 1st, did not advance – 26th overall)
 João Santos
 Heats (heat 2) — 2:04.74 (→ 2nd, did not advance – 29th overall)

50m Freestyle:
 Paulo Trindade
 Heats (heat 6) — 24.02 (→ 5th, did not advance – 31st overall)
 Sérgio Esteves
 Heats (heat 5) — 24.24 (→ 2nd, did not advance – 30th overall)

1500m Freestyle:
 Artur Costa
 Heats (heat 2) — 15:56.13 (→ 7th, did not advance – 30th overall)

200m Individual Medley:
 Diogo Madeira
 Heats (heat 4) — 2:10.21 (→ 2nd, did not advance – 28th overall)

400m Individual Medley:
 Rui Borges
 Heats (heat 2) — 4:30.79 (→ 3rd, did not advance – 22nd overall)
 Diogo Madeira
 Heats (heat 2) — 4:35.00 (→ 5th, did not advance – 26th overall)

4 × 100 m Freestyle Relay:
 Mabílio Albuquerque, Henrique Villaret, Sérgio Esteves and Vasco Sousa
 Heats (heat 1) — 3:33.31 (→ 5th, did not advance – 14th overall)

Women's Events
100m Butterfly:
 Sandra Neves
 Heats (heat 3) — 1:04.60 (→ 3rd, did not advance – 27th overall)

200m Butterfly:
 Sandra Neves
 Heats (heat 2) — 2:18.29 (→ 5th, did not advance – 18th overall)

Weightlifting
Men's Lightweight (–67,5 kg):
 Paulo Duarte
Group C — 275,0 kg (→ 14th)
{|class=wikitable style="text-align:center;"
!rowspan=2|Event!!colspan=3|Attempt!!rowspan=2|Result
|-
!1!!2!!3
|-
!Snatch
|120,0||125,0||127,5||125,0
|-
!Clean& Jerk
|150,0||155,0||155,0||150,0
|-
!colspan=4|Total
|275,0
|}

Wrestling
Men's Greco-Roman Flyweight (–52 kg):
 José Marques
Group B:
 Round 1 — Pete Stjernberg (SWE) (→ lost by injury)
 Round 2 — Jae-Suk Lee (KOR) (→ lost by injury; did not advance)

Officials
 Celorico Moreira (chief of mission)

References

Seoul Olympic Organizing Committee (1989). Official Report of the Games of the XXIV Olympiad Seoul 1988 - Volume 1: Organization and planning (Retrieved on November 10, 2006).
Seoul Olympic Organizing Committee (1989). Official Report of the Games of the XXIV Olympiad Seoul 1988 - Volume 2: Competition summary and results (Retrieved on November 10, 2006).
International Olympic Committee - Olympic medal winners database
sports-reference

Nations at the 1988 Summer Olympics
1988 Summer Olympics
1988 in Portuguese sport